El Roble is a corregimiento in Aguadulce District, Coclé Province, Panama. Its population as of 1990 was 7,097; its population as of 2000 was 7,997.

References

Corregimientos of Coclé Province